Helen Tobias-Duesberg (11 June 1919 – 4 February 2010) was an Estonian-American composer.

Life
Helen Tobias was born in Suure-Jaani, Estonia on 11 June 1919. Tobias was the youngest daughter of Estonian composer, Rudolf Tobias, born seven months after his death. She studied music composition at the Tallinn Conservatoire, which is now known as the Estonian Academy of Music and Theatre, under Artur Kapp and Heino Eller. She  graduated from the Conservatoire as an organist in 1943. She later studied at the Berlin University of Music as well.

During World War II, she met her future husband, William Duesberg, a journalist who was repeatedly imprisoned for writing stories critical of Adolf Hitler. Shortly after the war, Duesberg died of a heart attack in a Stuttgart courtroom while preparing to testify against several Nazi war criminals.

Tobias-Duesberg moved to the United States from Estonia, which was then part of the Soviet Union, in 1951.  She began composing music and performing at several churches in New York City. She composed chamber, vocal and symphonic pieces, the most famous of which may be Requiem, which was composed for orchestra, mixed choir and soloists. During the Civil Rights Movement, she played the organ at Friendship Baptist Church in Harlem when the Rev. Martin Luther King Jr. served as a guest preacher.

Meanwhile, she composed violin and cello sonatas, string quartets, song cycles, concertos, and a wide range of choral works. Her compositions have been performed on major concert stages in the U.S., Canada, and Europe as well as the Aspen, Ravinia and Spoleto festivals.

During a cultural backlash against classical music in the 1960s and 1970s, American conductor Leonard Bernstein described Tobias-Duesberg as a female composer who "dares to be original and musical at the same time, while all the men run around writing intellectual cacophony."

Helen Tobias-Duesberg died in Savannah, Georgia, on 4 February 2010, aged 90.

Selected works
Orchestral
 Ballaade orkestrile (Ballade on Estonian and Carelian Folktunes) for orchestra

Concertante
 Concert Piece for cello and chamber orchestra

Chamber music
 Koraal-prelüüdid for violin, cello and piano
 Sextet for brass
 Sonata for violin and piano
 Sonata in G for cello and piano
 String Quartet No. 2
 Trio for violin, flute and piano
 Trio in C for violin, viola (or cello) and piano

Piano
 Classical Suite
 Parafraas eesti rahvalaulude viisidele (Prelude on Estonian Folksongs)
 4 Preludes

Vocal
 Sa tulid nagu päikene for voice and piano

Choral
 Missa brevis for mixed chorus and keyboard accompaniment
 Psalm 102 for mixed chorus and organ
 Requiem for female chorus and keyboard accompaniment
 Vaimulik õhtu-muusika (Sacred Evening Service) for mixed chorus, baritone, soprano and organ

References

1919 births
2010 deaths
People from Suure-Jaani
American women classical composers
American classical composers
Estonian emigrants to the United States
American organists
20th-century organists
20th-century classical composers
21st-century American composers
21st-century classical composers
20th-century Estonian composers
Women organists
20th-century American women musicians
20th-century American composers
Estonian Academy of Music and Theatre alumni
21st-century American women musicians
20th-century women composers
21st-century women composers